Jim Cummings is an American voice actor who has appeared in almost 400 roles in films, television, and video games.

Film

Animation 

 Aaahh!!! Real Monsters – Additional Voices
 Adventures in Odyssey – Larry Walker, King Lawrence
 Back at the Barnyard – Captain Tom, Chef Big Bones Mignon
 The Batman – Temblor
 Ben 10: Omniverse – Vexx, Hulex Colonel (episode "Food Around the Corner")
 Boo to You Too! Winnie the Pooh – Winnie-the-Pooh, Tigger
 Bump in the Night – Mister Bumpy, Destructo, Closet Monster
 Captain Planet and the Planeteers – Sly Sludge (Hanna-Barbera episodes)
 Cartoon All-Stars to the Rescue – Winnie-the-Pooh, Tigger
 Codename: Kids Next Door – Vin Moosk (episode "Operation: K.N.O.T.")
 Courage the Cowardly Dog – The Great Fusilli
 Cro – Phil, Ogg, Murray
 Curious George – Chef Pisghetti, Jumpy Squirrel, Mister Quint
 Dead Space Downfall – Captain Mathius
 Dexter's Laboratory – Red-Eye (episode "Photo Finish"), Organ Grindor (Dial M for Monkey episode "Organ Grindor")
 Doug – Additional voices
 Extreme Ghostbusters – Opening music theme song
 Fanboy & Chum Chum – Professor Flan
 Fish Hooks – Scientist No. 2 (episode "Parasite Fright")
 The Flintstone Kids - Additional voices (Season 1)
 Foofur - Additional voices (Season 2)
 Generator Rex – Additional voices
 Goldie & Bear – Big Bad Wolf, Sir Dwight, Giant
 Gravity Falls – Additional voices
 The Grim Adventures of Billy & Mandy – Nasalmancer, Biker, additional voices
 The High Fructose Adventures of Annoying Orange – Tomato, Pineapple
 The Hot Rod Dogs and Cool Car Cats – Scarhood
 Invasion America – Major Lomack
 Jackie Chan Adventures – Hak Foo (Season 1)
 Johnny Bravo – Additional voices
 Lilo & Stitch: The Series: Zach Mackillin, Rodeo Announcer
 Loonatics Unleashed – Additional voices
 Marsupilami – Maurice, Norman
 Megas XLR – Additional voices
 Merry Madagascar – Lead Reindeer
 Midnight Patrol: Adventures in the Dream Zone – Additional voices
 Mighty Magiswords – Buford, Keeper of the Mask
 Motorcity – Dr. Hudson
 The Mummy – High Priest Imhotep
 The New Woody Woodpecker Show – Additional voices
 New Looney Tunes – Tasmanian Devil, Blacque Jacque Shellacque
 Niko and the Sword of Light – The Narrator, Mugwhump and Darkness
 OK K.O.! Let's Be Heroes – Lord Boxman
 Ozzy & Drix – Ernst Strepfinger (Season 2), Chief Gluteus
 The Penguins of Madagascar – Ridiculously Deep Voice and Chrome Claw (episode "Dr. Blowhole's Revenge")
 Pepper Ann – Mr. Carter (Pepper Ann's science teacher) and Some One-Shot Characters
 Perfect Strangers – Additional Characters (1986–1993)
 Phineas and Ferb – Intro Narrator (episode “Phineas and Ferb Star Wars: May the Ferb Be with You”)
 Pickle and Peanut – Additional voices
 Planet Sheen – Ultra Lord (episode "Cutting the Ultra-Cord")
 Pound Puppies - Additional voices (Season 2)
 Project G.e.e.K.e.R. – Mister Moloch and Will Dragonn
 ProStars – Additional voices
 Quack Pack – Additional voices
 Randy Cunningham: 9th Grade Ninja – Catfish Booray
 Regular Show – Additional voices
 The Replacements – Additional voices
 Road Rovers – General Parvo
 Robot Chicken – The Spirit of the Ark, Lex Luthor, Doctor
 Rude Dog and the Dweebs – Satch
 Saturday Night Live – Papa Smurf, Gargamel (season 28 premiere)
 The Savage Dragon – Dragon
 Scooby-Doo! Mystery Incorporated – Captain Caveman (episode "Mystery Solvers State Club Finals")
 The Secret Files of the Spy Dogs – Bald Spokesperson, Flea Leader, Von Rabie, Catastrophe
 The Shnookums and Meat Funny Cartoon Show – Narrator, Dr. Paul Bunion
 Skylanders Academy – Malefor
 Snorks – Various characters
 Sofia the First – Wormwood the Raven, Goodwin the Great
 Sonic the Hedgehog (SatAM) – Doctor Robotnik, SWATbots, Nasty Hyena member (episode "Fed Up With Antoine"), additional voices
 The Spectacular Spider-Man – Crusher Hogan, Burglar
 Spider-Man – Hammerhead, Ghost
 The Super Hero Squad Show – Thanos (Season 2), Super-Skrull (Season 2), Human Torch
 The Sylvester and Tweety Mysteries – Moo Goo Guy Pan, Sam Ficus, Rocky, Tasmanian Devil
 Tales from the Crypt – Judge Vic "Leave 'Em Hanging" Johnson ("The Third Pig")
 Teen Titans – Master of Games and Wildebeest (episode "Winner Take All")
 The Transformers – Afterburner, Rippersnapper
 Transformers: Rescue Bots – Colonel Quint Quarry
 Transformers: Robots in Disguise – Clampdown
 The Twisted Tales of Felix the Cat
 Unfiltered – Narrator
 Visionaries: Knights of the Magical Light – Witterquick & the Bearer of Knowledge
 Where's Waldo? – Narrator
 What's New, Scooby-Doo? – Cyrus T. Buford, Crawdad Mike ("Big Scare in the Big Easy"), Broderick Bosepheus ("Wrestle Maniacs")
 Wild West C.O.W.-Boys of Moo Mesa – Dakota Dude, Saddle Sore, Skull Duggery, Jack
 Wild Discovery – Narrator
 Winx Club – Taboc the Wise, Ice Guardian/Spirit
 W.I.T.C.H. – Tridart, Harold Hale, Zacharias

Video games 

 Disney's Aladdin in Nasira's Revenge – Razoul
 Alpha Protocol – Conrad Marburg
 Anastasia: Adventures with Pooka and Bartok – Grigori Rasputin
 Animaniacs – Himself, Radio News
 Army Men Series – All Voices (sans Females)
 Baldur's Gate Series – Minsc, Firkraag, Gorion, Tazok, Abazigal, Gromnir Il-Khan, Demogorgon
 Blazing Dragons - King Allfire, Chancellor
 Cartoon Network Universe: FusionFall
 CatDog: Quest for the Golden Hydrant – Cat
 ClayFighter 63⅓ – Houngan, Sumo Santa
 Clive Barker's Jericho – Arnold Leach
 Disney's Dinosaur – Bruton
 Dragon Age: Origins – Additional voices
 Earthworm Jim 3D – Psy-Crow, Bob the Killer Goldfish, Fatty Roswell
 Epic Mickey – Pete (as Small Pete, Big Bad Pete, Petetronic, & Pete Pan)
 Epic Mickey 2: The Power of Two – Pete (as Small Pete, Big Bad Pete, Pete Pan, & Petetronic)
 Epic Mickey: Power of Illusion – Pete
 Fallout – The Master, Set, Gizmo
 Fallout 4 – The Scribe, Institute Scientist, Mr. Able, Benjamin Beasley, Cedric Hopton, Fisherman, Settlers, Vault 81 Residents
 Fallout 4: Nuka-World – Maurice Turner, Dr. Hein, Nuka-Galaxy Announcer
 Fisher Price: Castle – King Smudge
 Fisher Price: Pirate Ship -
 Grand Theft Auto V – The Local Population
 Guild Wars 2 – Sadizi
 Hades Challenge – Additional voices
 Icewind Dale – Arundel, Hrothgar, additional voices
 Infinity Blade II – Additional voices
 Kinect Disneyland Adventures – Winnie the Pooh, Tigger, Cheshire Cat
 Kingdom Hearts series – Pete, Winnie the Pooh, Tigger, Ed, Cheshire Cat, Julius
 Kingdoms of Amalur: Reckoning – Gadflow & Encel
 Lara Croft and the Guardian of Light – Totec, Lara's Partner, Xolotl
 Lightning Returns: Final Fantasy XIII – Additional Voices
 The Lost Vikings 2 – Olaf the Stout, Tomator.
 Looney Tunes: Acme Arsenal – Taz
 Looney Tunes: Cartoon Conductor – Taz
 Marvel Super Hero Squad: The Infinity Gauntlet – Thanos
 Marvel: Ultimate Alliance 2 – Thor, Scorpion
 Mass Effect 2 – Urdnot Wreav, additional voices
 Mickey's Speedway USA – Pete
 Minecraft: Story Mode – Hadrian
 MultiVersus – Taz 
 Nickelodeon All-Star Brawl – CatDog (Cat), Shredder (voiceover added in the June 2022 update)
 Nickelodeon Extreme Tennis - CatDog (Cat)
 Nickelodeon Kart Racers 3: Slime Speedway - CatDog (Cat)
 Nickelodeon Party Blast – CatDog (Cat)
 Nicktoons MLB – Ultra Lord
 Painkiller – Alastor
 Piglet's Big Game – Winnie the Pooh, Tigger
 Quest for Glory IV: Shadows of Darkness – Boris, Hans
 Reader Rabbit Preschool – Rex the Monster
 Scooby Doo and Looney Tunes: Cartoon Universe – Yosemite Sam, Tasmanian Devil
 Splatterhouse – The Terror Mask
 Spider-Man: Edge of Time – Additional voices
 Spider-Man: Shattered Dimensions – Kraven the Hunter, Norman Osborn/Goblin (consoles and PC), Boomerang, Tinkerer (Nintendo DS)
 Star Wars: The Old Republic – Master Oteg, General Skylast
 1991 – Teenage Mutant Ninja Turtles: Turtles in Time – Leatherhead and Shredder (Arcade version only)
 The Elder Scrolls V: Skyrim – Elderly Males
 The Elder Scrolls Online – Additional voices
 Tigger's Honey Hunt – Winnie the Pooh, Tigger
 Tom and Jerry in War of the Whiskers – Lion
 Toonstruck – Feedback, B.B. Wolf, Dough, Snout, Seedy, Warp
 Wacky Races: Starring Dastardly and Muttley – Dick Dastardly
 Walden, a game – Ralph Waldo Emerson
 WildStar – Victor Lazarin, The Sarge, Osiric, Taxi Cab, Commander Kriton, Jarak, Granok Male
 Winnie the Pooh Kindergarten – Winnie the Pooh, Tigger
 Winnie the Pooh Preschool – Winnie the Pooh, Tigger
 Winnie the Pooh's Rumbly Tumbly Adventure – Winnie the Pooh, Tigger
 World of Warcraft: Mists of Pandaria – Narrator of the Pandaren cinematic intro, Shen-zin Su, Wei Palerage, Lorewalker Cho, Doyo’da, Tong the Fixer, Lorewalker Ruolin for the song of Liu Lang
 World of Warcraft: Legion – Havi, Runas the Shamed
 World of Warcraft: Battle for Azeroth – Lorewalker Cho, High Commander Kamses
 World of Warcraft: Shadowlands – Additional voices
 Ys: Book I&II – Dalles

AudioBooks

Fiction Podcasts

Live-action 
 Comic Book: The Movie – Dr. Cedric Perview
 I Know That Voice – Himself
 Youngstown: Still Standing – Himself/narrator

Theme park attractions 
 Flight of Fear at Kings Island and Kings Dominion - Narrator and Alien Leader
 Terminator 2: 3-D Battle Across Time in Universal Studios Theme Parks – Opening Sequence Narrator
 IllumiNations: Reflections of Earth at Epcot in Walt Disney World – Narrator
 Mickey and Minnie's Runaway Railway at Disney's Hollywood Studios in Walt Disney World Resort – Pete
 Roger Rabbit's Car Toon Spin at Mickey's Toontown in Disneyland – Baby Herman
 Millennium Falcon: Smugglers Run at Star Wars: Galaxy's Edge in Disneyland Resort and Walt Disney World Resort – Hondo Ohnaka

Commercials 
 United States Forest Service - Smokey Bear (1993–2006)

References

American filmographies
Male actor filmographies